Thomas M. French (born January 3, 1958) is an American writer and journalist.

Personal details
Thomas M. French was born Jan. 3, 1958 to Hans and Katherine (née Darst) French in Columbus, Ohio and was raised in Indianapolis, Indiana. While at Indiana University, he was the editor-in-chief of the Indiana Daily Student, the recipient of a Poynter scholarship, the winner of the Hearst Competition for Feature Writing, and graduated in 1980. His first marriage was to Linda French (née Rogowski). French has two sons, Nathaniel and Samuel. He married Kelley Benham in 2006. Benham documented the birth of their daughter Juniper, who was born an extreme preemie in the series "Never Let Go," published in the Tampa Bay Times, for which she was a finalist for the 2013 Pulitzer Prize for Feature Writing.

Career
Thomas French's career with the St. Petersburg Times spanned 27 years between 1981 and 2008. He is known for feature writing but he started off on the police and courts beats, as well as general assignments. He is the Riley Endowed Chair in journalism in the Media School at Indiana University.

Notable works of journalism
In 1998, the Times won its sixth Pulitzer Prize. French won for Feature Writing for his piece “Angels and Demons,” the story of the murders of Jo, Michelle and Christe Rogers and the eventual capture of the murderer, Oba Chandler.

French wrote the series "South of Heaven," later expanded into a book of narrative nonfiction, about students at the end of the 1980s at Largo High School with the cooperation of LHS journalism teacher Jan Amburgy.

He collaborated on "13", a mini-series that ran in the St. Petersburg Times about middle schoolers at Booker T. Washington Middle Magnet School for International Studies in Tampa.

His piece "The Exorcist in Love" is an in-depth investigation into the life and work of Laura Knight (now Laura Knight-Jadczyk).

According to Washington Post reporter Anne Hull, French's work has set the standard for a generation of reporters:

He wrote a seminal piece of journalism called 'A Cry In The Night' that dominated our craft for a long time and made a model for the rest of us to follow," Hull said. "He's been my teacher since the day I met him. IU will soon get a glimpse of his passion and ferocious belief that journalism should be fair and truthful but also raucous, subversive, emotional and daring.

His 2010 book about Lowry Park Zoo in Tampa, Florida is called Zoo Story: Life in the Garden of Captives.

Awards
In 1992, Thomas French won the Livingston Award for Young Journalists for his local reporting on a high school.

In 1998, French won the Pulitzer Prize for Feature Writing.

In 2015, French was inducted into the Indiana Journalism Hall of Fame.

References
 A Year in the Life of a High School
 Angels & Demons
 Laura Knight
 Never Let Go, written by wife Kelley Benham about the couple's daughter

Footnotes

1958 births
Living people
Indiana University alumni
Journalists from Indiana
Writers from Indianapolis
Pulitzer Prize for Feature Writing winners
Tampa Bay Times
Writers from Columbus, Ohio
Journalists from Ohio
American male journalists
20th-century American non-fiction writers
21st-century American non-fiction writers
Indiana University faculty
Goucher College faculty and staff
20th-century American male writers
21st-century American male writers